Madame Alphonsine-Thérèse-Bernardine-Julie de Montgenêt de Saint-Laurent (30 September 1760 – 8 August 1830) was the wife of Baron de Fortisson, a colonel in the French service, and the mistress of Prince Edward, Duke of Kent and Strathearn.

Madame de Saint-Laurent was born 30 September 1760 in Besançon, France to Jean-Claude Mongenêt, a civil engineer, and Jeanne-Claude (Claudine) Pussot and later moved to Quebec.

On the formation of Lower Canada, in August, 1791, Prince Edward, Duke of Kent and Strathearn arrived in Quebec City and shortly afterwards leased Judge Mabane's house for £90 per annum. He lived at the Duke of Kent House in Quebec City for three years with Madame de Saint Laurent, before he was posted to Halifax, Nova Scotia in 1794.

History 
While in Geneva, the Duke had been introduced to the de Fortissons and soon after Julie and Edward became lovers. The Duke's father, King George III, enrolled Edward in the army and had him posted to Gibraltar, where Edward made arrangements for her to be smuggled so they could be together. George III later found out about the affair and so sent the Duke to Quebec City as colonel of the 7th Fusiliers. Humiliated, at first he refused to go, but in August 1791 he arrived accompanied by his chatelaine, introduced as Julie de Saint-Laurent and reputed to be a widow. It has been claimed by several writers that she was secretly married to the Duke of Kent at a Roman Catholic church in Quebec.

For twenty-eight years Madame de Saint-Laurent presided over the Duke's household, as a local chronicler records, "with dignity and propriety." She is described as having been beautiful, clever, witty and accomplished. Many of her letters will be found in Anderson's "Life of the Duke of Kent" (Quebec: 1870). After the Duke's marriage in 1818 to the Dowager Princess of Leiningen, Madame de Saint-Laurent retreated to Paris where she lived out her days amongst her family and friends.

There is no evidence of children but many families in Canada have claimed descent from the couple. Recent scholarship (particularly by Mollie Gillen, who was granted access to the Royal Archive at Windsor Castle) has established that no children were born of the 27-year relationship between Edward Augustus and Madame de Saint-Laurent; although many Canadian families and individuals (including the Nova Scotian soldier Sir William Fenwick Williams, 1st Baronet) have claimed descent from them, such claims can now be discounted in light of this new research.

She died in 1830 and was buried with her sister, Jeanne-Beatrix, Comtesse de Jansac, at Père Lachaise Cemetery in Paris.

Legacy 
She has given her name to two roads and a pond in the neighborhood of Prince's Lodge in Bedford, Nova Scotia:

 Julie's Pond or The Heart Shaped Pond - a man-made body of water built on order by Prince Edward at the foot of Kent Road in what is now Hemlock Ravine Park 
 St. Laurent Place - short residential road in Prince's Lodge, Nova Scotia
 Julie's Walk, Bedford - short residential road in Prince's Lodge, Nova Scotia

References 

Endnotes

Texts
 
 Mollie Gillen. The Prince and His Lady: The Love Story of the Duke of Kent and Madame de St Laurent. Formac. 2005.

1830 deaths
1760 births
People from Besançon
Immigrants to Lower Canada
French baronesses
Mistresses of British royalty
Burials at Père Lachaise Cemetery